Several countries have one or more national theatres. This component in the name of a theatre indicates that the funding is not only a concern of private investors or the local city, but of the national or federal budget. The Comédie-Française in Paris, founded in 1680, is widely considered to be the world's first national theatre.

Albania: National Theatre of Albania
Argentina: Teatro Nacional Cervantes
Australia:
National Theatre in St Kilda, Victoria
National Theatre in Launceston, Tasmania
Austria: Burgtheater in Vienna
Bosnia and Herzegovina: 
Sarajevo National Theatre
Croatian National Theatre in Mostar
Brazil: 
Teatro Nacional Cláudio Santoro in Brasília
Theatro Municipal do Rio de Janeiro
Bulgaria: Ivan Vazov National Theatre
Canada: National Arts Centre of Canada in Ottawa
China: The National Centre for the Performing Arts in Beijing
Costa Rica: Teatro Nacional de Costa Rica
Croatia: National Theatres, including
Croatian National Theatre in Zagreb
Croatian National Theatre in Split
Croatian National Theatre in Osijek
Czech Republic: 
National Theatre in Prague
National Theatre in Brno
National Moravian-Silesian Theatre in Ostrava
Denmark: Royal Danish Theater
The Old Stage, Kongens Nytorv
Copenhagen Opera House
Royal Danish Playhouse
Stærekassen
El Salvador: Teatro Nacional de El Salvador, San Salvador
Ethiopia: Ethiopian National Theatre, Addis Ababa
Finland: Finnish National Theatre
France: Comédie-Française
Germany: The National Theatres in Munich, in Mannheim and in Weimar
Ghana: The National Theatre in Accra
Greece: The National Theatre in Athens and the National Theatre of Northern Greece in Thessaloniki
Hungary: The National Theatres in Budapest, Győr, Miskolc, Pécs and Szeged
Iceland: Þjóðleikhúsið (National Theatre), Reykjavík
India: National Theatre (Kolkata), Kolkata, India
Ireland: The Abbey Theatre, Dublin
Israel: Habima Theatre, Tel Aviv
Italy: National Dramatic Theatre, Rome
Japan:
 National Theatre, Tokyo
 New National Theatre, Tokyo
 National Noh Theatre, Tokyo
 National Bunraku Theatre, Osaka
 National Theater Okinawa, Urasoe
Kenya: Kenya National Theatre
Latvia: Latvian National Theatre, Riga
Malaysia: National Theater in Kuala Lumpur
Mali: Palais de la Culture Amadou Hampaté Ba
Malta: Manoel Theatre, Valletta
Mexico: National Theatre of Mexico, Mexico City
Moldova: 
Bălți National Theatre
Chişinău National Theatre, Chişinău
Montenegro: Montenegrin National Theatre, Podgorica
Netherlands: Het Nationale Theater, The Hague
Myanmar: National Theatre of Yangon, National Theatre of Mandalay
Norway: Nationaltheatret (National Theatre) in Oslo
Nigeria: National Arts Theatre in Lagos
Philippines: Tanghalang Pambansa (National Theater) (in the Cultural Center of the Philippines Complex) in Manila
Poland: The Teatr Narodowy in Warsaw
Portugal:
 The Teatro Nacional D. Maria II in Lisbon
 The Teatro Nacional de São Carlos in Lisbon
 The Teatro Nacional São João in Oporto
Republic of Ireland: The National English language Theatre of Ireland in Dublin is more commonly called the Abbey Theatre. The National Irish language Theatre is the Taibhdhearc in Galway.
Romania: 
 National Theatre Bucharest
 Cluj-Napoca National Theatre 
 Iaşi National Theatre
Serbia: 
National Theatre in Belgrade
Serbian National Theatre in Novi Sad
Slovakia: Slovak National Theatre
Slovenia:
Ljubljana Slovene National Theatre Drama
Maribor Slovene National Theatre
Nova Gorica Slovene National Theatre
Sri Lanka: Navarangahala in Colombo
Somalia: National Theatre of Somalia in Mogadishu
South Korea: National Theater of Korea in Seoul
Spain:
Castile: Teatro Nacional María Guerrero, Madrid
Catalonia: National Theatre of Catalonia, Barcelona 
Sweden: Royal Dramatic Theatre, Stockholm
Taiwan:
 National Kaohsiung Center for the Arts, Kaohsiung
 National Theater and Concert Hall, Taipei
 National Taichung Theater, Taichung
Thailand: National Theatre of Thailand in Bangkok
Turkey: Turkish State Theatres
Uganda: National Theatre of Uganda
United Arab Emirates: The National Theater in Abu Dhabi
United Kingdom:
The Royal National Theatre or The National Theatre on London's South Bank
Scotland: The National Theatre of Scotland
Wales: National Theatre Wales, Theatr Genedlaethol Cymru (Welsh Language)
United States: The National Theatre of the Deaf in Connecticut
National Theatre of Venezuela

Not national theatres
Some theatres carry "national theatre" in their name without being governmentally funded national theatres:
United States: The National Theatre in Washington, D.C.
Vietnam: Hanoi Opera House in Hanoi

See also
National Theatre (disambiguation), a list of theatres that include the term "National Theatre"

References

 
National